Spelling is the writing of words with all necessary letters and diacritics present in an accepted, conventional order.

Spelling or Spellings is the name of:
 Aaron Spelling (1923–2006), American film and television producer
 Candy Spelling (born 1945), author, socialite, widow of Aaron Spelling
 Randy Spelling (born 1978), American actor
 Margaret Spellings (born 1957), United States Secretary of Education from 2005–2009
 Tori Spelling (born 1973), American actress

See also
 Spell (disambiguation)
 Orthography
 Letter (alphabet)
 Spellling, the project of American musician Chrystia Cabral (born 1991)